Colin Richard Bateman Bird''' was an Anglican  priest in the  late 20th and early 21st centuries.

He was born on 31 March 1933, educated at Selwyn College, Cambridge, and ordained in 1958. His first posts were curacies at St Mark's Cathedral, George and St Saviour's Claremont, Cape Town since 1996. He then held incumbencies in Pretoria and Tzaneen. On his return to England he was Curate at Limpsfield then Vicar of St Catherine, Hatcham. In 1988 he became Archdeacon of Lambeth, a post he held for 11 years. He died on 2 June 2010.

Notes

1933 births
Alumni of Selwyn College, Cambridge
Archdeacons of Lambeth
2010 deaths